Roger Le Bras (22 December 1919 – 28 July 2008) was a French water polo player. He competed in the men's tournament at the 1948 Summer Olympics.

References

External links
 

1919 births
2008 deaths
French male water polo players
Olympic water polo players of France
Water polo players at the 1948 Summer Olympics